Kalmytskiye Mysy is a rural locality (a selo) and the administrative center of Kalmytsko-Mysovskoy Selsoviet, Pospelikhinsky District, Altai Krai, Russia. The population was 1,151 in 2016. There are 12 streets.

Geography 
Kalmytskiye Mysy is located on the Loktevka River, 37 km southeast of Pospelikha (the district's administrative centre) by road. Ilyinka is the nearest rural locality.

References 

Rural localities in Pospelikhinsky District